Bates Smart is an architectural firm with studios in Melbourne and Sydney, Australia. Founded in 1853 by Joseph Reed, it is known as one of Australia's oldest architectural firms. Over the decades, the firm's multidisciplinary practices involving architecture, interior design, urban design, strategy, sustainability and research, have been responsible for some of Australia’s most well-known and loved buildings.

History

Joseph Reed, born in 1823 in Cornwall, England, established his firm upon his arrival in Melbourne in 1853, and in 1863, joined with British architect Frederick Barnes, renaming his practice to Reed & Barnes. Their name is linked to many of the major buildings of nineteenth-century Melbourne, including the Melbourne Public Library (now known as the State Library of Victoria), Melbourne Town hall, Rippon Lea, Elsternwick, and Scots Church. The Melbourne International Exhibition building is regarded as one of the greatest buildings to be completed by Reed & Barnes. 

In 1883 Barnes retired, and A. Henderson and Francis Smart joined Joseph Reed as partners to create Reed, Henderson & Smart. In 1890 Reed died, Henderson withdrew, and William Tappin joined, creating Reed Smart & Tappin. In 1907, N. G. Peebles joined, creating Smart Tappin & Peebles, but with the rapid departure of Tappin, and addition of E. A. Bates, the firm became known as Bates Pebble & Smart the next year. After Peebles died in 1923, the firm became Bates Smart McCutcheon in 1926 when Osborn McCutcheon became a partner; he remained Principal Partner until his retirement. Since 1995 the firm has been known simply as Bates Smart. 

The current directors are Matthew Allen, Julian Anderson, Jefferey Copolov, and Cian Davis.

Notable projects

Gallery

References

External links

Bates Smart website

Architecture firms of Australia
Architecture firms based in Victoria (Australia)
Australian companies established in 1853
Design companies established in 1853
Companies based in Melbourne
19th-century Australian architects
20th-century Australian architects
21st-century Australian architects